Asbury Lanes located in Asbury Park, New Jersey is a vintage bowling alley and bar with live performances ranging from live musical acts, burlesque, hot rod, dance parties, film and art shows. It is one of the many historic music landmarks located within Asbury Park. These include The Stone Pony, the Wonderbar, the Saint and the Fastlane.

Music venue
Since its re-opening in 2003, Asbury Lanes has hosted many notable bands, mostly of the punk rock variety. The bowling lanes double as center stage when bands are playing and as a dance floor.

On October 3, 2015, the venue announced that it was closing for renovations. It was later confirmed that real estate investment company, iStar, purchased the venue as part of a multibillion dollar redevelopment plan for Asbury Park. Having previously purchased 58 bowling alleys for $104 million in 2014, iStar is restoring the building with an intent to keep it operating as a bowling alley with ticketed events once it reopens in 2017.

Notable acts
Mainly consisting of punk rock bands, Asbury Lanes has also hosted other genres of music as well as non-musical acts.

Some notable acts to have played Asbury Lanes include: The Beths, Big D and the Kids Table, Butthole Surfers, The Bouncing Souls, D.O.A., Dick Dale, Epoxies, The Ergs!, Every Time I Die, The Germs, Jello Biafra and the Guantanamo School of Medicine, John Doe, Jucifer, The Julie Ruin, King Khan and the Shrines, Los Straitjackets, Me First and the Gimme Gimmes, The Menzingers, Mick Jones of the Clash, Mike Gordon, Mod Fun, Murphy's Law, Negative Approach, Neil Hamburger, of Montreal, OFF!, Reverend Horton Heat, Screaming Females, Shonen Knife, Spring Heeled Jack, Street Dogs, The Supersuckers, Swingin' Utters, The Toasters, Wanda Jackson, Yesterdays Rising

Film

Asbury Lanes has also played host to the Tromapalooza. Tromapalooza is a fan gathering and small scale film festival featuring films new and old from Troma film studios such as the Toxic Avenger and Sgt. Kabukiman, NYPD. Lloyd Kaufman films was on hand presenting both films and acts. As well as playing host to Tromapalooza, Asbury Lanes has also become a sponsor of the 2010 and 2011 TromaDance film festival in Asbury Park and will host the TromaDance After Party.

See also
Asbury Park
Asbury Park Music Awards
The Saint
The Stone Pony
Wave Gathering

References

External links
 Asbury Lanes official website

Asbury Park, New Jersey
Bowling alleys
Music venues in New Jersey
Tourist attractions in Monmouth County, New Jersey
1962 establishments in New Jersey